Sirenian Shores is an EP by the Norwegian gothic metal band Sirenia. It was released on 11 October 2004 by Napalm Records. It is the last work recorded with the female lead singer Henriette Bordvik, who left the band in November 2005.

Background 
This EP is essentially a compilation of new versions of two of the best songs from Sirenia previous albums, and three unreleased songs that only appear here. 

It includes a remix of "Save Me from Myself" (from the second album An Elixir for Existence), an acoustic version of "Meridian" (from the first album At Sixes and Sevens), and three new songs: "Sirenian Shores", "Obire Mortem" and a cover of Leonard Cohen's "First We Take Manhattan".

Track listing
All tracks written and composed by Morten Veland, except where noted.

Personnel
All information from the EP booklet.

Sirenia
 Morten Veland – harsh vocals, guitars, bass, keyboards, drum programming, mixing
 Henriette Bordvik – female vocals

Additional musicians
 Fabienne Gondamin – vocals on "Meridian"
 Emmanuelle Zoldan – vocals on "First We Take Manhattan", choir vocals
 Kristian Gundersen – clean vocals
 Anne Verdot – violin

Choir
 Damien Surian, Emilie Lesbros, Johanna Giraud, Sandrine Gouttebel, Hubert Piazzola, Mathieu Landry

Production
 Terje Refsnes – mixing, engineering
 Ulf Horbelt – mastering
 Joachim Luetke – artwork, design
 Emile M.E. Ashley – photography

References

Sirenia (band) albums
2004 EPs
Napalm Records EPs